Pathfinder is a maze  shooter written by Randy Jongens for the Atari 8-bit, published in 1982 by Gebelli Software.

Gameplay

The object of Pathfinder is to clean an underground maze of canisters of radioactive waste. These canisters are scattered in the maze and can be collected on contact by the Pathfinder, controlled by the player. Complicating this, radioactive creatures will attempt to stop the player. These are: Nukes, absorbing power from nuclear waste, Phantoms, moving through walls and Minelayers moving throughout the whole level placing mines. To defend himself the player is armed with a plasma gun that can be fired in any of eight directions. If the player shoots a mine, he will start a fire, which can spread through a maze.

A level is completed by removing all radioactive waste. The game has nine levels, each characterized by color changes and sometimes changes in the structure of the maze itself.

Reception
The Addison-Wesley Book of Atari Software 1984 concluded: "It's very hard to classify this game as either good or bad. While on the one hand it appeared to be a superficial and repetitious game, many of the teens who played it enjoyed seeing half of the maze on fire and then trying to put it out."

References

External links

Pathfinder at Atari Mania

Review in Creative Computing
Review in Compute!

1982 video games
Atari 8-bit family games
Atari 8-bit family-only games
Maze games
Video games about nuclear technology
Video games developed in the United States